The Castelló Masters was a European Tour golf tournament that was played annually from 2008 through 2011. The event was held at the Club de Campo del Mediterráneo in Castellón, Spain.

The inaugural event was won by Sergio García, who also happened to be the tournament host, having grown up playing golf on the course where his father is the club professional. García finished on a 20-under-par total of 264, winning by a margin of three strokes over Peter Hedblom.

In 2010, 17-year-old Italian Matteo Manassero became the youngest-ever winner on the European Tour when he triumphed by 4 strokes over Ignacio Garrido.

In 2011, Sergio García shot which would have been the lowest aggregate on the European Tour at the time, however this record did not count as preferred lies where in place during the week.

Winners

Notes

References

External links
 Coverage on the European Tour's official site

Former European Tour events
Golf tournaments in Spain
Recurring sporting events established in 2008
Recurring sporting events disestablished in 2011
Defunct sports competitions in Spain